The Pacific Coast League Manager of the Year Award is an annual award given to the best manager in Minor League Baseball's Pacific Coast League based on their regular-season performance as voted on by league managers. Broadcasters, Minor League Baseball executives, members of the media, coaches, and other team representatives from the league's clubs have previously voted as well. Though the league was established in 1903, the award was not created until 1967. After the cancellation of the 2020 season, the league was known as the Triple-A West in 2021 before reverting to the Pacific Coast League name in 2022.

The only manager to win the award on three occasions is Dan Rohn, who won in 2001, 2004, and 2005. Four others have each won twice: Rocky Bridges, Stubby Clapp, Jim Lefebvre, and Jimy Williams. Clapp (2017 and 2018), Lefebvre (1985 and 1986), and Rohn (2004 and 2005) won the award in consecutive years.

Seven managers from the Tacoma Rainiers have been selected for the Manager of the Year Award, more than any other team in the league, followed by the Phoenix Firebirds (5); the Tucson Sidewinders (4); the Hawaii Islanders, Iowa Cubs, Las Vegas Aviators, Portland Beavers, and Salt Lake City Angels (3); the Albuquerque Dukes, Albuquerque Isotopes, Colorado Springs Sky Sox, Memphis Redbirds, Nashville Sounds, Oklahoma City Dodgers, Salt Lake Bees, and Spokane Indians (2); and the Edmonton Trappers, Eugene Emeralds, Reno Aces, Round Rock Express, Sacramento River Cats, Tulsa Oilers, and Vancouver Canadians (1).

Seven managers from the Los Angeles Angels and Los Angeles Dodgers Major League Baseball (MLB) organizations have each won the award, more than any others, followed by the Oakland Athletics organization (6); the San Francisco Giants organization (5); the Chicago Cubs and Seattle Mariners organizations (4); the Cleveland Guardians, Houston Astros, and St. Louis Cardinals organizations (3); the Arizona Diamondbacks, Minnesota Twins, Philadelphia Phillies, and Texas Rangers organizations (2); and the Milwaukee Brewers, New York Mets, Pittsburgh Pirates, and San Diego Padres organizations (1).

Winners

Wins by team

Active Pacific Coast League teams appear in bold.

Wins by organization

Active Pacific Coast League–Major League Baseball affiliations appear in bold.

Notes

References
Specific

General

Awards established in 1967
Minor league baseball coaching awards
Manager